Willow Hill is an unincorporated community in Metal Township in Franklin County, Pennsylvania, United States. Willow Hill is located along Pennsylvania Route 75 at its interchange with the Pennsylvania Turnpike (Interstate 76), which is called the Willow Hill interchange.

References

Unincorporated communities in Franklin County, Pennsylvania
Unincorporated communities in Pennsylvania